Bronisław Kasper Malinowski (7 April 1884 – 16 May 1942) was a Polish-British anthropologist and ethnologist whose writings on ethnography, social theory, and field research have exerted a lasting influence on the discipline of anthropology.

Malinowski was born in what was part of the Austrian partition of Poland, and completed his initial studies at Jagiellonian University in his birth city of Kraków. From 1910, at the London School of Economics (LSE), he studied exchange and economics, analysing Aboriginal Australia through ethnographic documents. In 1914 he travelled to Australia. He conducted research in the Trobriand Islands and other regions in New Guinea and Melanesia where he stayed for several years, studying indigenous cultures.

Returning to England after World War I, he published his principal work, Argonauts of the Western Pacific (1922), which established him as one of Europe's most important anthropologists. He took posts as a lecturer and later as chair in anthropology at the LSE, attracting large numbers of students and exerting great influence on the development of British social anthropology. Over the years, he guest-lectured at several American universities; when World War II broke out, he remained in the United States, taking an appointment at Yale University. He died in 1942 and was interred in the United States. In 1967 his widow, Valetta Swann, published his personal diary kept during his fieldwork in Melanesia and New Guinea. It has since been a source of controversy, because of its ethnocentric and egocentric nature.

Malinowski's ethnography of the Trobriand Islands described the complex institution of the Kula ring and became foundational for subsequent theories of reciprocity and exchange. He was also widely regarded as an eminent fieldworker, and his texts regarding anthropological field methods were foundational to early anthropology, popularizing the concept of participatory observation. His approach to social theory was a form of psychological functionalism that emphasised how social and cultural institutions serve basic human needs—a perspective opposed to A. R. Radcliffe-Brown's structural functionalism, which emphasised ways in which social institutions function in relation to society as a whole.

Biography

Early life
Malinowski, scion of Polish szlachta (nobility), was born on 7 April 1884 in Kraków, in the Austrian partition of the former Polish-Lithuanian Commonwealth—then part of the Austro-Hungarian province known as the Kingdom of Galicia and Lodomeria. His father, Lucjan Malinowski, was a professor of Slavic philology at the Jagiellonian University, and his mother was the daughter of a landowning family. As a child he was frail, often suffering from ill health, but excelled academically. On 30 May 1902 he passed his matura examinations (with distinction) at the Jan III Sobieski Secondary School, and later that year began studying at the College of Philosophy of Kraków's Jagiellonian University, where he initially focused on mathematics and the physical sciences.

While attending the university he became severely ill (possibly with tuberculosis) and, while he recuperated, his interest turned more toward the social sciences as he took courses in philosophy and education. In 1908 he received a doctorate in philosophy from the Jagiellonian University; his thesis was titled On the Principle of the Economy of Thought.

During his student years he became interested in travel abroad, and visited Finland, Italy, the Canary Islands, western Asia, and North Africa; some of those travels were at least partly motivated by health concerns. He also spent three semesters at the University of Leipzig (ca. 1909-1910), where he studied under economist Karl Bücher and psychologist Wilhelm Wundt. After reading James Frazer's The Golden Bough, he decided to become an anthropologist.

In 1910 he went to England, becoming a postgraduate student at the London School of Economics (LSE), where his mentors included C. G. Seligman and Edvard Westermarck.

Career
In 1911 Malinowski published, in Polish, his first academic paper, "Totemizm i egzogamia" ("Totemism and Exogamy"), in Lud. The following year he published his first English-language academic paper, and in 1913 his first book, The Family among the Australian Aborigines, and gave his first lectures at the LSE, on topics related to psychology of religion and social psychology.

In June 1914 he departed London, travelling to Australia, as the first step in his expedition to Papua (in what would later become Papua New Guinea). The expedition was organized under the aegis of the British Association for the Advancement of Science (BAAS). In fact, initially Malinowski's journey to Australia was supposed to last only about half a year, as he was mainly planning on attending a conference there, and travelled there in a capacity of a secretary to Robert Ranulph Marett. Shortly afterward, his situation became complicated due to the outbreak of World War I as although Polish by ethnicity, he was a subject of Austria-Hungary, which was in a state of war with the United Kingdom. Malinowski, at risk of internment, nonetheless decided not to return to Europe from the British-controlled region and after intervention by a number of his colleagues, including Marett as well as Alfred Cort Haddon, British authorities allowed him to stay in the Australian region and even provided him with new funding.

His first field trip, lasting from August 1914 to March 1915, took him to the Toulon Island (Mailu Island) and the Woodlark Island. This field trip was described in his 1915 monograph The natives of Mailu. Subsequently, he conducted research in the Trobriand Islands in the Melanesia region.  He organized two larger expeditions during that time; from May 1915 to May 1916, and October 1917 to October 1918, in addition to several shorter excursions. It was during this period that he conducted his fieldwork on the Kula ring (a ceremonial exchange system conducted by the natives he studied) and advanced the practice of participant observation, which remains the hallmark of ethnographic research today. The ethnographic collection of artifacts from his expeditions is mostly held by the British Museum and the Melbourne Museum. During the breaks in between his expeditions he stayed in Melbourne, writing up his research, and publishing new articles, such as Baloma; the Spirits of the Dead in the Trobriand Islands. In 1916 he received the title of Doctor of Sciences.

In 1919, he returned to Europe, staying at Tenerife for over a year before coming back to England in 1920 and finally to London in 1921. He resumed teaching at the LSE, accepting a position as a lecturer, declining a job offer from the Polish Jagiellonian University. The following year, his book Argonauts of the Western Pacific, often described as his masterpiece, was published. For the next two decades, he would establish the LSE as Europe's main centre of anthropology. In 1924 he was promoted to a reader, and in 1927, a full professor (foundation Professor of Social Anthropology). In 1930 he became a corresponding foreign member of the Polish Academy of Arts and Sciences. In 1933, he became a foreign member of the Royal Netherlands Academy of Arts and Sciences.  In 1934 he travelled to British East Africa and Southern Africa, carrying out research among several tribes such as the Bemba, Kikuyu, Maragoli, Maasai and the Swazi people. The period 1926-1935 was the most productive time of his career, seeing the publications of many articles and several more books.

Malinowski taught intermittently in the United States, which he first visited in 1926 to study the Hopi Indians. When World War II broke out during one of his American visits, he stayed there. He became an outspoken critic of Nazi Germany, arguing that it posed a threat to civilization, and he repeatedly urged US citizens to abandon their neutrality; his books duly became banned in Germany. In 1941 he carried out field research among the Mexican peasants in Oaxaca. He took up a position at Yale University as a visiting professor, where he remained until his death. In 1942 he co-founded the Polish Institute of Arts and Sciences of America, of which he became its first president.

In addition to his work in academia, he has been described as a "wittily entertaining pundit" who wrote and spoke in media of the day on various issues, such as religion and race relations, nationalism, totalitarianism, and war, as well as birth control and sex education. He was a supporter of the British Social Hygiene Council, Mass-Observation, and the International African Institute.

Malinowski died in New Haven, Connecticut on 16 May 1942, aged 58, of a stroke while preparing to resume his fieldwork in Oaxaca. He was interred at Evergreen Cemetery in New Haven.

Works 
Except for a few works from the early 1910s, all of Malinowski's research was published in English. His first book, The Family among the Australian Aborigines, published in 1913, was based on materials he collected and wrote in the years 1909-1911. It was well-received not only by contemporary reviewers but also by scholars generations later. In 1963, in his foreword to its new edition, John Arundel Barnes called it an epochal work, and noted how it discredited the previously held theory that Australian Aborigines had no institution of family.

Published in 1922, Argonauts of the Western Pacific, about the society and economy of Trobriand people who live on the small Kiriwana island chain northeast of the island of New Guinea, was widely regarded as a masterpiece and significantly boosted Malinowski's reputation in the world of academia. His later books included Crime and Custom in Savage Society (1926), Myth in Primitive Psychology (1926), Sex and Repression in Savage Society (1927), The Father in Primitive Psychology (1927), The Sexual Life of Savages in North-Western Melanesia (1929), and Coral Gardens and Their Magic (1935). The works tackled issues such as reciprocity and quasi-legal sanctions (in Crime...), psychoanalysis of ethnographic findings (in Sex and Repression...) courtship, sex, marriage, and the family (in The Sexual Life...), and perceived connections between agriculture and magic (in Coral Gardens...).

A number of his works were published posthumously or collected in anthologies: A Scientific Theory of Culture and Others Essays (1944), Freedom & Civilization (1944), The Dynamics of Culture Change (1945), Magic, Science and Religion and Other Essays (1948), Sex, Culture, and Myth (1962), the controversial A Diary in the Strict Sense of the Term (1967), and The Early Writings of Bronislaw Malinowski (1993).

Malinowski's personal diary, along with several others written in Polish, was discovered in his Yale University office after his death. First published in 1967, covering the period of his fieldwork in 1914–1915 and 1917–1918 in New Guinea and the Trobriand Islands, it set off a storm of controversy and what Michael W. Young called a "moral crisis of the discipline". Writing in 1987, James Clifford called it "a crucial document for the history of anthropology".

Many of Malinowski's works entered public domain in 2013.

Ideas and influences

Already a year after his death Clyde Kluckhohn described his influence in the field as significant if somewhat controversial, noting that to some he "was a major prophet", and that "no anthropologist has ever had so wide a popular audience". In 1974 Witold Armon described many of his works as "classics". Michael W. Young outlined Malinowski's major contributions as the comparative study of concepts of kinship, marriage, the family; magic, mythology, and religion. His work impacted numerous fields such as economic anthropology; comparative law, and in pragmatic linguistic theory.

Ethnography and fieldwork 
Malinowski is considered one of anthropology's most skilled ethnographers, especially because of his highly methodical and well-theorised approach to the study of social systems. He is often referred to as the first researcher to bring anthropology "off the verandah" (a phrase that is also the name of a André Singer's 1986 documentary about his work), that is, stressing the need for fieldwork enabling the researcher to experience the everyday life of his subjects along with them. Malinowski emphasized the importance of detailed participant observation and argued that anthropologists must have daily contact with their informants if they are to adequately record the "imponderabilia of everyday life" that are so important to understanding a different culture. He stated that the goal of the anthropologist, or ethnographer, is "to grasp the native's point of view, his relation to life, to realize his vision of his world". Because of the influence of his argument, he is sometimes credited, particularly in the United Kingdom, with having invented the field of ethnography. J. I. (Hans) Bakker says that Malinowski "wrote at least two of the 100 most significant ethnographies of all time".

Malinowski in his pioneering research literally set up a tent in the middle of villages he studied, in which he lived for extended periods of time, weeks or months. His argument was shaped by his initial experiences as an anthropologist in the mid-1910s in Australia and Oceania, where during his first field trip he found himself grossly unprepared for it, due to not knowing the language of the people he set to study, nor being able to observe their daily customs sufficiently (during that initial trip, he was lodged with a local missionary and just made daily trips to the village, an endeavor which became increasingly difficult once he lost his translator). His pioneering decision to subsequently immerse himself in the life of the natives represents his solution to this problem, and was the message he addressed to new, young anthropologists, aiming to both improve their experience and allow them to produce better data.

He advocated that stance from his very first publications, which were often harshly critical of those of his elders in the field of anthropology, who did most of their writing based on second-handed accounts. This could be seen in the relation between Frazer - an influential early anthropologist, nonetheless described as the classic armchair scholar - and Malinowski was complex; Frazer was one of Malinowski's mentors and supporters, and his work is credited with inspiring young Malinowski to become an anthropologist. At the same time, Malinowski was critical of Frazer from his early days, and it has been suggested that what he learned from Frazer was not "how to be an anthropologist" but "how not to do anthropology". Ian Jarvie wrote that many of Malinowski's writing represented an "attack" on Frazer's school of fieldwork, although James A. Boon suggested this conflict has been exaggerated.

His early works also contributed to scientific study of sex, previously restricted due to Euro-American prudery and views on morality. Malinowski's interest in the topic has been attributed to his Slavic background having made him less concerned with "Anglo-Saxon puritanism".

Functionalism and other theories 
Malinowski has been credited with originating, or being one of the main originators of, the school of social anthropology known as functionalism. It has been suggested that he was here inspired by the views of William James. In contrast to Radcliffe-Brown's structural functionalism, Malinowski's psychological functionalism held that culture functioned to meet the needs of individuals rather than the needs of society as a whole. He reasoned that when the needs of individuals, who comprise society, are met, then the needs of society are met. Malinowski understood basic needs as arising from the necessities of biology; and culture, as group cooperation – as a way of addressing the basic needs. Thus, biological needs include metabolism, reproduction, bodily comforts, safety, movement, growth, and health; and the corresponding cultural responses are a food supply, kinship, shelter, protection, activities, training, and hygiene.

The development of Malinowski's theory of psychological functionalism was intimately tied to his focus on the importance of fieldwork: the anthropologist must, via empirical observation, investigate the functions of the customs observed in the present. To Malinowski, people's feelings and motives were crucial to understanding the way their society functioned, which he outlined as follows:

Malinowski, in what is considered an important contribution to cross-cultural psychology, challenged the claim, to universality, of Freud's theory of the Oedipus complex. Malinowski initiated a cross-cultural approach in Sex and Repression in Savage Society (1927), demonstrating that specific psychological complexes are not universal.

In 1920 he published his first scientific article on the Kula ring. In reference to the Kula ring, he later wrote:

In these two passages, Malinowski anticipated the distinction between description and analysis, and between the views of actors and analysts. This distinction continues to inform anthropological methods and theories. His research on the Trobriand traditional economy, with its particular focus on magic and magicians, has been described as a substantial contribution to economic anthropology.

Overall, Malinowski has been credited with "contesting existing stereotypes", such as dismissals of “primitive economics”, through his study of the Kula ring, which demonstrated how economics was embedded in culture. He criticized the term “primitive superstition”, demonstrating complex relations among magic, science, and religion. Likewise his study of sexuality undermined simplistic views of “primitive sexuality”.

Malinowski influenced African studies, serving as academic mentor to Jomo Kenyatta, the father and first president of modern Kenya. Malinowski wrote the introduction to Facing Mount Kenya, Kenyatta's ethnographic study of the Kikuyu. Many of Malinowski's students worked in Africa, likely due to his involvement with the International African Institute.

Teacher 
Malinowski is considered to have raised the next generation of anthropologists, particularly British. Many of his students adopted his functionalist approach. As a teacher, he preferred lectures to discussions; his seminars have been called "electrifying". He has been praised for his friendly and egalitarian attitude towards women students. Among his students were such future social scientists as Hilda Beemer Kuper, Edith Clarke, Kazimierz Dobrowolski, Raymond Firth, Meyer Fortes, Feliks Gross, Francis L. K. Hsu, Phyllis Kaberry, Jomo Kenyatta, Edmund Leach, Lucy Mair, Z. K. Matthews, Józef Obrębski, Maria Ossowska, Stanisław Ossowski, Ralph Piddington, Hortense Powdermaker, E. E. Evans-Pritchard, Margaret Read, Audrey Richards, Isaac Schapera, Andrzej Jan Waligórski, Camilla Wedgwood, Monica Wilson and  Fei Xiaotong.

Remembrance 

The Malinowski Memorial Lecture, an annual anthropology lecture series at the LSE, inaugurated in 1959, is named after him. A student-led anthropology magazine at the LSE, The Argonaut, took its name from Malinowski's Argonauts of the Western Pacific.

The Society for Applied Anthropology established the Bronislaw Malinowski Award in his honor in 1950. The award was awarded only until 1952, then went on hiatus until being re-established in 1973; it has been awarded annually since.

Stanisław Ignacy Witkiewicz based a character, Duke of Nevermore, from his novel The 622 Downfalls of Bungo or The Demonic Woman (written in the 1910s but not published until 1972) on Malinowski.

In 1957 Raymond Firth edited a book dedicated to the life and work of Malinowski, Man and Culture. Other works about Malinowski have appeared since, such as Michael W. Young's Malinowski: Odyssey of an Anthropologist, 1884–1920 (2004).

He is portrayed by Tom Courtenay in the Young Indiana Jones TV movie Treasure of the Peacock's Eye.

The life and work of Malinowski is the subject of a documentary film Tales From The Jungle: Malinowski aired by BBC Four channel in 2007.

Personal life 
In his youth he was a close friend of Stanisław Ignacy Witkiewicz, a Polish artist; this friendship had much impact on Malinowski's early life. They had a romantic triangle with Zofia Romer née Dembowska. Throughout his life he gained the reputation of a philanderer.

His other friends from his student times included Maria Czaplicka, the first female lecturer in anthropology at Oxford University.

In 1919 Malinowski married Elsie Rosaline Masson, an Australian photographer, writer, and traveler (daughter of David Orme Masson), with whom he had three daughters: Józefa (born 1920), Wanda (born 1922), and Helena (born 1925). Elsie died in 1935, and in 1940 Malinowski married the English painter Valetta Swann. Malinowski's daughter Helena Malinowska Wayne wrote several articles on her father's life and a book about her parents.

While Malinowski was brought up in the Roman Catholic faith, after his mother's death he described himself as agnostic.

Selected publications

See also
 List of Poles

Notes

References

Further reading 
 

 Vermeulen, Han F. & Frederico Delgado Rosa (eds.). 2022. “Before and After Malinowski: Alternative Views on the History of Anthropology [A Virtual Round Table at the Royal Anthropological Institute, London, 7 July 2022]” (with the participation of Sophie Chevalier, Barbara Chambers Dawson, Thomas Hylland Eriksen, Michael Kraus, Adam Kuper, Herbert S. Lewis, Andrew Lyons, David Mills, David Shankland, James Urry, and Rosemary Lévy Zumwalt), BEROSE International Encyclopaedia of the Histories of Anthropology, Paris.

External links

 
 
Malinowski; Archive (Real audio stream) of BBC Radio 4 edition of 'Thinking allowed' on Malinowski
Baloma; the Spirits of the Dead in the Trobriand Islands, at sacred-texts.com
Papers of Bronislaw Malinowski held at LSE Library
Malinowski's fieldwork photographs, Trobriand Islands, 1915–1918
Savage Memory – documentary about Malinowski's legacy
Bronislaw Malinowski papers (MS 19). Manuscripts and Archives, Yale University Library.

 
1884 births
1942 deaths
19th-century anthropologists
19th-century non-fiction writers
20th-century anthropologists
20th-century non-fiction writers
Academics of the London School of Economics
Alumni of the London School of Economics
Anthropologists of religion
British agnostics
British emigrants to Poland
British emigrants to the United States
British ethnographers
British ethnologists
Cornell University faculty
Economic anthropologists
Functionalism (social theory)
Jagiellonian University alumni
Members of the Royal Netherlands Academy of Arts and Sciences
Naturalised citizens of the United Kingdom
Polish agnostics
Polish anthropologists
Polish Austro-Hungarians
Polish emigrants to the United Kingdom
Polish emigrants to the United States
Polish ethnographers
Polish ethnologists
Scientists from Kraków
Social anthropologists
Trobriand Islands